Ulster Park is a hamlet in Ulster County, New York, United States. Ulster Park has a post office with ZIP code 12487, which opened on November 29, 1847.

References

Hamlets in Ulster County, New York
Hamlets in New York (state)